is a 2015 Japanese drama film directed by Takashi Ishii. It is a sequel to Gonin and stars Masahiro Higashide and Masanobu Andō.

Cast
Masahiro Higashide as Hayato Hisamatsu
Kenta Kiritani as Daisuke Ogoshi
Anna Tsuchiya as Asami Kikuchi
Tasuku Emoto as Keiichi Morisawa
Masanobu Andō as Seiji Shikine
Jinpachi Nezu as Kaname Hizu
Rila Fukushima as Yoichi
Terry Ito as Takamasa Shikine
Harumi Inoue as Yasue Hisamatsu
Lily as Katsuko Ogoshi
Wakana Matsumoto as Yurika
Shun Sugata as Yuzuru Matsuura
Shunya Isaka as Masayuki Kuroki
Shingo Tsurumi as Shigeru Hisamatsu, Hayato's father
Kōichi Satō (special appearance) as Mikihiko Bandai
Naoto Takenaka as Myojin

References

External links
 

2015 drama films
2015 films
Films directed by Takashi Ishii
Japanese drama films
Japanese sequel films
2010s Japanese films
2010s Japanese-language films